Charles Haig Bridgford (8 October 1910 – 4 January 1993) was an Australian politician.  A member of the Liberal Party, Bridgford represented the South Eastern Province in the Victorian Legislative Council from 1955 to 1961.

References
 DEATH OF Mr CHARLES HAIG BRIDGFORD, Victorian Parliamentary HANSARD, 16 March 1993.

1910 births
1993 deaths
Liberal Party of Australia members of the Parliament of Victoria
20th-century Australian politicians